The Avoid Bay Islands Conservation Park is a protected area in the Australian state of South Australia occupying three islands located west-southwest of Coffin Bay on the Eyre Peninsula. The group, which includes Black Rocks and Sudden Jerk Island (also known as Avoid Island), supports breeding populations of seabirds and marine mammals. Colonies of the endangered Australian Sea-lion (Neophoca cinerea) and protected New Zealand Fur-seal (Arctocephalus forsteri) occur on some of these islands.
The conservation park is classified as an IUCN Category Ia protected area.

References

External links
Avoid Bay Islands Conservation Park webpage on protected planet
 

Conservation parks of South Australia
Protected areas established in 1968
1968 establishments in Australia
Great Australian Bight
Islands of South Australia